Bilali is usually a surname. It is derived from the Muslim name Bilal. Notable people with the surname include:

Afrim Bilali (born 1979), Albanian basketball player
Amir Bilali (born 1994), Albanian footballer
Dejvi Bilali (born 1996), Albanian footballer
Edmir Bilali (born  1970), Albanian footballer
Ferdinand Bilali (born 1969), Albanian footballer
Ibrahim Bilali (born 1965), Kenyan boxer
Suleiman Bilali (born  1978), Kenyan boxer

See also
Bilali Document, is a handwritten Arabic manuscript on West African Islamic law by Bilali Muhammed

References